Caterina Murino (born 15 September 1977) is an Italian actress. She began her acting career in the 1999 production of the play Richard III and later made her breakthrough with the 2004 film The Corsican File. She went on to appear in the 2006 film Casino Royale and received a European Golden Globe at the 2008 Italian Golden Globe Awards.

Life and career
Murino was born in Cagliari, Sardinia, and initially wanted to be a doctor. She finished fifth in the 1997 Miss Italy contest. She studied drama at the Scuola di Cinema e Teatro run by Francesca De Sapio, between 1999 and 2000. She then appeared in stage productions of Richard III and Italian-language plays. She began her career in television in 2002, and then gained international fame after playing Solange Dimitrios in the 2006 adaptation of the James Bond novel Casino Royale.

In early 2011, she co-starred with Rufus Sewell in the short-lived BBC One TV series Zen.

In 2011 she also appeared in Bob Sinclar's music video clip Far l'amore. She also starred in the video clip of the famous party band The Gypsy Queens' "l'Italiano".

In 2013, she starred as Penelope, Ulysses' wife for a TV production Odysseus.

Selected filmography

Nowhere (2001)
L'Enquête Corse (2004)
L'Amour Aux Trousses (2004)
Eleonora d'Arborea (2005)
Les Bronzés 3 : Amis pour la vie (2006)
Vientos de agua (2006)
Casino Royale (2006)
St. Trinian's (2007)
Il seme della discordia (2008)
The Garden of Eden (2008)
Alibi e sospetti (2008)
XIII (2009)
Die (2010)
Zen (2011)
Odysseus (2013)
The Invincible Piglet (2015)
The Squad (2015)
Fever (2016)
We Are Family (2016)
Voice from the Stone (2017)
Agadah (2017) principessa
Se son rose (2018)
My Brother, My Sister' (2021)
 Venecefrenia (2021)Simone'' (2021)
 In search of Ingrid (TBA)

References

External links

1977 births
Living people
People from Cagliari
Italian film actresses
21st-century Italian actresses
Sardinian women